Soscumica Lake is a lake of the southern portion of Eeyou Istchee James Bay (municipality), in the administrative region of Nord-du-Québec, in the province of in south-western Quebec, Canada. The southern part of Lake Soscumica extends into Millet Township.

Forestry is the main economic activity of the sector. Recreational tourism (especially hunting and fishing) comes second, thanks to the navigable body of water, including the tributaries.

The west side of the lake is served by a winter road (North-South direction). The surface of the lake is usually frozen from early November to mid-May, however, safe ice circulation is generally from mid-November to mid-April.

Geography 
Lake Soscumica has many islands, peninsulas and bays.

This lake is crossed by the Nottaway River which drains the Lake Matagami (located in the South). The confluence of the Nottaway River with Soscumica Lake is located at  North of downtown Matagami, Quebec.

The main hydrographic slopes near Soscumica Lake are:
North side: Muskiki River, Iskaskunikaw River, Pauschikushish Ewiwach River;
East side: Waswanipi River, Ouescapis Lake, Poncheville Lake, Chensagi River, Maicasagi River;
South side: Nottaway River, Matagami Lake;
West side: Nottaway River, Deux Lacs River, Montreuil Lake, Kitchigama River.

The mouth of this lake Soscumica is located at:
 southeasterly of the mouth of the Nottaway River (confluence with Rupert Bay);
 north of downtown Matagami;
 east of the Quebec - Ontario border;
 northwest of the mouth of Matagami Lake.

Toponymy
Geologist Robert Bell, exploring the Nottaway River in 1895-1896, translates Soscumica by slippery shores. This name could come from the term "soos'koskumikaw", "soo'skwaw", slippery and oskumikaw, soil, ground.

The name "Lac Soscumica" was officialized on December 5, 1968 by the Commission de toponymie du Québec when it was created.

Notes and references

See also 

James Bay
Rupert Bay
Nottaway River, a watercourse
Deux Lacs River, a watercourse
Muskiki River, a watercourse
James Bay
Eeyou Istchee Baie-James (municipality), a municipality
List of lakes in Canada

Lakes of Nord-du-Québec